The Football Federation of Belarus (BFF;) is the governing body of football and futsal in Belarus. It organizes the Belarusian Premier League, Belarusian national football team and the Belarus women's national football team. It is based in Minsk.

After the 2022 Russian invasion of Ukraine, FIFA and UEFA, the European governing body for football, temporarily suspended Belarusian national and club teams from international competitions, which was later reversed, and UEFA banned Belarus from hosting international competitions.

Presidents
 Evgeny Shuntov (Yawhen Shuntaw, 1989–1999)
 Grigory Fedorov (Ryhor Fyodaraw, 1999–2003)
 Gennady Nevyglas (Henadz Nevyhlas, 2003–2011)
 Sergei Rumas (22 April 2011 – 2019)
 Vladimir Bazanov (Uladzimir Bazanaw, from 2019)

References

External links
Official website

 Belarus page at UEFA.com
Belarus at FIFA.com

Belarus
Football in Belarus
Futsal in Belarus
Football
1989 establishments in Belarus
Sports organizations established in 1989